Žarko Lazetić (born 22 February 1982) is a Serbian football manager and former player.

Playing career
In December 2006, it was announced that Lazetić had agreed to join Partizan from Bežanija in the January transfer window, along with his teammate Antonio Rukavina. The duo later signed four-year deals with Lazetić being assigned the number 10 shirt. He spent one and a half seasons with the Crno-beli, collecting the double in the 2007–08 campaign.

In July 2008, Lazetić signed a two-year contract with Vojvodina. He stayed at the Stadion Karađorđe for one year, before going abroad and joining Greek club Rodos. He scored nine goals in the 2009–10 Beta Ethniki, but failed to help the side avoid relegation.

In early 2011, Lazetić moved to Indonesia to play for Persis Solo under his compatriot Branko Babić. He subsequently returned to Serbia, having brief spells with Javor Ivanjica and Bežanija, before retiring from the game in the summer of 2013.

Managerial career
Lazetić started his managerial career at Srem Jakovo of the Serbian League Belgrade in the summer of 2014. He would become an assistant to newly appointed Teleoptik manager Ivan Tomić in October 2015, alongside Dražen Bolić. The trio performed the same roles at Partizan between December 2015 and July 2016 when Tomić resigned from his position due to poor results. In October 2016, Lazetić took charge of the Partizan youth team with Bolić serving as his assistant. They won the league title in May 2017. In June 2018, Lazetić joined Miroslav Đukić's staff as an assistant at Partizan, replacing departed Andrija Delibašić. He also served as caretaker manager for the club in March 2019. The following month, Lazetić returned to Teleoptik as manager.

In June 2020, Lazetić was appointed as manager of Serbian SuperLiga club Metalac Gornji Milanovac. He left them in November 2021 to take over at TSC Bačka Topola.

Personal life
Lazetić is the younger brother of fellow footballer Nikola Lazetić.

Managerial statistics

Honours

Club
Bežanija
 Serbian First League: 2005–06
Partizan
 Serbian SuperLiga: 2007–08
 Serbian Cup: 2007–08

Individual
 Serbian First League Top Scorer: 2005–06
 Serbian Cup Top Scorer: 2006–07

References

External links
 
 
 

Association football forwards
Expatriate footballers in Greece
Expatriate footballers in Indonesia
FK Beograd players
FK Bežanija players
FK Javor Ivanjica players
FK Metalac Gornji Milanovac managers
FK Mladi Obilić players
FK Partizan non-playing staff
FK Partizan players
FK Teleoptik managers
FK TSC Bačka Topola managers
FK Vojvodina players
Football League (Greece) players
Kosovo Serbs
Persis Solo players
Rodos F.C. players
Second League of Serbia and Montenegro players
Serbia and Montenegro footballers
Serbian expatriate footballers
Serbian expatriate sportspeople in Indonesia
Serbian expatriate sportspeople in Greece
Serbian First League players
Serbian football managers
Serbian footballers
Serbian SuperLiga managers
Serbian SuperLiga players
Sportspeople from Mitrovica, Kosovo
1982 births
Living people